The Kurt Hahn Expeditionary Learning School (the Kurt Hahn School) is a New York City public school working in partnership with New York City Outward Bound and Expeditionary Learning. Recently the former principal Mr. Matthew Brown has stepped down as principal at The Kurt Hahn Expeditionary Learning School. Ms. Veronica Coleman is the principal.

History

Founding
The school was founded in 2007. It opened in the Tilden Educational Complex (see Samuel J. Tilden High School) in East Flatbush, New York.  During the first year, the school had only 70 9th graders.  The high school will add a grade each year until is it 9-12.

Kurt Hahn
Kurt Hahn was the founder of several innovative and successful educational programs, among them Outward Bound and the United World Colleges.

Academics

Expeditionary learning
Expeditionary Learning, the school model of the Kurt Hahn School, is based upon the following benchmarks:
I. Learning Expeditions
II. Active Pedagogy
III. Culture & Character
IV. Leadership & School Improvement
V. School Structures

Extracurriculars
Through a partnership with Publicolor, students from all schools on the Tilden Educational Campus united to repaint the facility in 2009.

Notable teachers and faculty
Founding principal, Matt Brown, was cited as the "most trustworthy principal in Brooklyn" based on survey results from the New York City Department of Education's Learning Environment Survey for the 2007-2008 school year. He was replaced by in September 2014 by Ms. Veronica Coleman taking his place. Jessica Jean-Marie is now Principal of the School.

See also
 Kurt Hahn

References

External links
 www.kurthahn.org
 School Reform Through „Experiential Therapy“: Kurt Hahn - An Effiacious Educator.
 Expeditionary Learning Schools
 New York City Outward Bound

Educational institutions established in 2008
Public high schools in Brooklyn
2008 establishments in New York City